Modern pentathlon competitions at the 2021 Junior Pan American Games in Cali, Colombia were held from 2 to 5 December 2021.

Medal summary

Medal table

Medalists

References

External links
Modern pentathlon at the 2021 Junior Pan American Games

Modern pentathlon
Junior Pan American Games
Qualification tournaments for the 2023 Pan American Games